Hollygirt School is an independent school near the centre of Nottingham, England for girls and boys aged 3 to 16.

History
Hollygirt School was founded in 1877 and moved to Elm Avenue in 1913. The name "Hollygirt" is said to have originated from its former premises at 82 Addison Street which had a holly hedge. Garfield House, the main Senior School building, was built in 1881, and used to be a convent. In September 2012 the school re-admitted  boys.
Following a consultation process with all stakeholders in January 2014, the decision was made that Hollygirt School would become fully coeducational from September 2014.
As a charity the school's accounts can be inspected on the charity commission website under the name ' The Rhonda Jessop education charity'.  Accounts show that the school ran at a loss from August 2014 to June 2017

School Structure
Hollygirt consists of a Nursery, a Junior School and a Senior School. There is no Sixth Form; pupils often continue their studies at one of several other nearby independent schools.

Houses
Pupils are placed in houses beginning in Year 1.

There are three Junior Houses:
Chestnut
Elm
Oak

There are four houses in the Senior School, all named after places in Nottinghamshire: 
Clumber
Rufford
Thoresby
Welbeck

Subjects

Core Subjects
These three subjects are compulsory for all studentsMathematicsEnglish LiteratureEnglish Language

Science
BiologyChemistryPhysicsComputer Science

Other Subjects
Art
Religious Studies
Geography
History
Music
Drama and Theatre Arts
Food and Nutrition
Design and Technology
 Business

Languages
French
Spanish

Extra Curricular Subjects
Statistics
PE

References

External links
School Website
Profile on the ISC website
Profile on MyDaughter
ISI Inspection Reports

Private schools in Nottingham
Girls' schools in Nottinghamshire
Member schools of the Girls' Schools Association
Educational institutions established in 1877
1877 establishments in England